In Fourier analysis, a multiplier operator is a type of linear operator, or transformation of functions. These operators act on a function by altering its Fourier transform. Specifically they multiply the Fourier transform of a function by a specified function known as the multiplier or symbol. Occasionally, the term multiplier operator itself is shortened simply to multiplier. In simple terms, the multiplier reshapes the frequencies involved in any function. This class of operators turns out to be broad: general theory shows that a translation-invariant operator on a group which obeys some (very mild) regularity conditions can be expressed as a multiplier operator, and conversely. Many familiar operators, such as translations and differentiation, are multiplier operators, although there are many more complicated examples such as the Hilbert transform.
 
In signal processing, a multiplier operator is called a "filter", and the multiplier is the filter's frequency response (or transfer function).

In the wider context, multiplier operators are special cases of spectral multiplier operators, which arise from the functional calculus of an operator (or family of commuting operators). They are also special cases of pseudo-differential operators, and more generally Fourier integral operators. There are natural questions in this field that are still open, such as characterizing the Lp bounded multiplier operators (see below).

Multiplier operators are unrelated to Lagrange multipliers, except that they both involve the multiplication operation.

For the necessary background on the Fourier transform, see that page. Additional important background may be found on the pages operator norm and Lp space.

Examples
In the setting of periodic functions defined on the unit circle, the Fourier transform of a function is simply the sequence of its Fourier coefficients. To see that differentiation can be realized as multiplier, consider the Fourier series for the derivative of a periodic function  After using integration by parts in the definition of the Fourier coefficient we have that

.

So, formally, it follows that the Fourier series for the derivative is simply the Fourier series for  multiplied by a factor . This is the same as saying that differentiation is a multiplier operator with multiplier .

An example of a multiplier operator acting on functions on the real line is the Hilbert transform.

Definition
Multiplier operators can be defined on any group G for which the Fourier transform is also defined (in particular, on any locally compact abelian group). The general definition is as follows. If  is a sufficiently regular function, let  denote its Fourier transform (where  is the Pontryagin dual of G). Let  denote another function, which we shall call the multiplier. Then the multiplier operator  associated to this symbol m is defined via the formula

In other words, the Fourier transform of Tf at a frequency ξ is given by the Fourier transform of f at that frequency, multiplied by the value of the multiplier at that frequency. This explains the terminology "multiplier".

Note that the above definition only defines Tf implicitly; in order to recover Tf explicitly one needs to invert the Fourier transform. This can be easily done if both f and m are sufficiently smooth and integrable. One of the major problems in the subject is to determine, for any specified multiplier m, whether the corresponding Fourier multiplier operator continues to be well-defined when f has very low regularity, for instance if it is only assumed to lie in an Lp space. See the discussion on the "boundedness problem" below. As a bare minimum, one usually requires the multiplier m to be bounded and measurable; this is sufficient to establish boundedness on  but is in general not strong enough to give boundedness on other spaces.

One can view the multiplier operator T as the composition of three operators, namely the Fourier transform, the operation of pointwise multiplication by m, and then the inverse Fourier transform. Equivalently, T is the conjugation of the pointwise multiplication operator by the Fourier transform. Thus one can think of multiplier operators as operators which are diagonalized by the Fourier transform.

Multiplier operators on common groups 

We now specialize the above general definition to specific groups G. First consider the unit circle  functions on G can thus be thought of as 2π-periodic functions on the real line. In this group, the Pontryagin dual is the group of integers,  The Fourier transform (for sufficiently regular functions f) is given by

and the inverse Fourier transform is given by

A multiplier in this setting is simply a sequence  of numbers, and the operator  associated to this multiplier is then given by the formula

at least for sufficiently well-behaved choices of the multiplier  and the function f.

Now let G be a Euclidean space . Here the dual group is also Euclidean,  and the Fourier and inverse Fourier transforms are given by the formulae

A multiplier in this setting is a function  and the associated multiplier operator  is defined by

again assuming sufficiently strong regularity and boundedness assumptions on the multiplier and function.

In the sense of distributions, there is no difference between multiplier operators and convolution operators; every multiplier T can also be expressed in the form Tf = f∗K for some distribution K, known as the convolution kernel of T. In this view, translation by an amount x0 is convolution with a Dirac delta function δ(· − x0), differentiation is convolution with δ'. Further examples are given in the table below.

Diagrams

Further examples

On the unit circle
The following table shows some common examples of multiplier operators on the unit circle

On the Euclidean space
The following table shows some common examples of multiplier operators on Euclidean space .

General considerations
The map  is a homomorphism of C*-algebras.

In particular, we see that any two multiplier operators commute with each other. It is known that multiplier operators are translation-invariant. Conversely, one can show that any translation-invariant linear operator which is bounded on L2(G) is a multiplier operator.

The Lp boundedness problem
The Lp boundedness problem (for any particular p) for a given group G is, stated simply, to identify the multipliers m such that the corresponding multiplier operator is bounded from Lp(G) to Lp(G). Such multipliers are usually simply referred to as "Lp multipliers". Note that as multiplier operators are always linear, such operators are bounded if and only if they are continuous. This problem is considered to be extremely difficult in general, but many special cases can be treated. The problem depends greatly on p, although there is a duality relationship: if  and 1 ≤ p, q ≤ ∞, then a multiplier operator is bounded on Lp if and only if it is bounded on Lq.

The Riesz-Thorin theorem shows that if a multiplier operator is bounded on two different Lp spaces, then it is also bounded on all intermediate spaces. Hence we get that the space of multipliers is smallest for L1 and L∞ and grows as one approaches L2, which has the largest multiplier space.

Boundedness on L2
This is the easiest case. Parseval's theorem allows to solve this problem completely and obtain that a function m is an L2(G) multiplier if and only if it is bounded and measurable.

Boundedness on L1 or L∞
This case is more complicated than the Hilbertian (L2) case, but is fully resolved. The following is true:

Theorem: In the euclidean space  a function  is an L1 multiplier (equivalently an L∞ multiplier) if and only if there exists a finite Borel measure μ such that m is the Fourier transform of μ.

(The "if" part is a simple calculation. The "only if" part here is more complicated.)

Boundedness on Lp for 1 < p < ∞

In this general case, necessary and sufficient conditions for boundedness have not been established, even for Euclidean space or the unit circle. However, several necessary conditions and several sufficient conditions are known. For instance it is known that in order for a multiplier operator to be bounded on even a single Lp space, the multiplier must be bounded and measurable (this follows from the characterisation of L2 multipliers above and the inclusion property). However, this is not sufficient except when p = 2.

Results that give sufficient conditions for boundedness are known as multiplier theorems. Three such results are given below.

Marcinkiewicz multiplier theorem 

Then m is an Lp multiplier for all 1 < p < ∞.

Mikhlin multiplier theorem 

This is a special case of the Hörmander-Mikhlin multiplier theorem.

Radial multipliers
Suppose that  is a radial multiplier compactly supported away from the origin.

This is a theorem of Heo, Nazarov, and Seeger.

Examples
Translations are bounded operators on any Lp. Differentiation is not bounded on any Lp. The Hilbert transform is bounded only for p strictly between 1 and ∞. The fact that it is unbounded on L∞ is easy, since it is well known that the Hilbert transform of a step function is unbounded. However, both the Marcinkiewicz and Mikhlin multiplier theorems show that the Hilbert transform is bounded in Lp for all .

Another interesting case on the unit circle is when the sequence  that is being proposed as a multiplier is constant for n in each of the sets  and  From the Marcinkiewicz multiplier theorem (adapted to the context of the unit circle) we see that any such sequence (also assumed to be bounded, of course) is a multiplier for every .

In one dimension, the disk multiplier operator (see table above) is bounded on Lp for every . However, in 1972, Charles Fefferman showed the surprising result that in two and higher dimensions the disk multiplier operator  is unbounded on Lp for every . The corresponding problem for Bochner–Riesz multipliers is only partially solved; see also Bochner–Riesz conjecture.

See also 
Calderón–Zygmund lemma
Marcinkiewicz theorem
Singular integrals
Singular integral operators of convolution type

Notes

Works cited

General references 
 
 
 
 
  (in Russian). 
 . This contains a comprehensive survey of all results known at the time of publication, including a sketch of the history.
 
 

Fourier analysis